Paspal Glacier is the 14.5 km long and 6.5 km wide glacier on Oscar II Coast, Graham Land in Antarctica situated southeast of Montgolfier Glacier and west of Hektoria Glacier.  Draining from the southeast slopes of Forbidden Plateau and flowing southeastwards between Zagreus Ridge and Dugerjav Peak to join Green Glacier.

The feature is named after the settlement of Paspal in southern Bulgaria.

Location
British mapping in 1974.

Maps
 Antarctic Digital Database (ADD). Scale 1:250000 topographic map of Antarctica. Scientific Committee on Antarctic Research (SCAR), 1993–2016.

References
 Paspal Glacier. SCAR Composite Antarctic Gazetteer.
 Bulgarian Antarctic Gazetteer. Antarctic Place-names Commission. (details in Bulgarian, basic data in English)

External links
 Paspal Glacier. Copernix satellite image

Glaciers of Oscar II Coast
Bulgaria and the Antarctic